Ray Pratt (1915-1990) also known as Roy Pratt was an Australian rugby league footballer who played in the 1930s and 1940s.  He played for St George and Eastern Suburbs in the NSWRL competition.

Playing career
Pratt made his first grade debut for St George in Round 1 1938 against Eastern Suburbs at the Sydney Cricket Ground.  At the end of the 1938 season, St George finished last on the table claiming their third and last wooden spoon.  As of 2019, neither St George nor the joint venture of St George Illawarra have finished last in the competition.

In 1941, Pratt played 8 games but missed out on playing in the 1941 NSWRL grand final victory over Easts.  The win was the club's first premiership since entering the competition in 1921.

In 1945, Eastern Suburbs reached the grand final against Balmain.  Easts won the match 22-18 claiming their 9th premiership in front of 
44,585 spectators at the Sydney Cricket Ground with Pratt playing at fullback.
Ray Pratt all played first Grade cricket opening the batting for StGeorge with the Great, Sir Donald Bradman. 

Pratt retired at the end of the 1946 season.

References

Sydney Roosters players
St. George Dragons players
Rugby league players from Sydney
Rugby league fullbacks
Rugby league wingers
1915 births
Year of death missing

Place of death missing